= Wyższa Szkoła Kupiecka =

Wyższa Szkoła Kupiecka can refer to two educational establishments:

- Wyższa Szkoła Kupiecka in Konin, Poland
- Wyższa Szkoła Kupiecka in Łódź, Poland
